The World According to Sesame Street is a 2006 documentary film created by Participant Productions, looking at the cultural impact of the children's television series Sesame Street, and the complexities of creating international adaptations. It focuses on the adaptations of Sesame Street in Bangladesh (Sisimpur), Kosovo (Rruga Sesam, in Albanian; and Ulica Sezam, in Serbian), and South Africa (Takalani Sesame). The film premiered at the 2006 Sundance Film Festival in the documentary competition.

The film was released on DVD on October 24, 2006. It was also featured that month on the public television documentary series Independent Lens.

The documentary included a segment featuring the introduction of an HIV-positive character on the South African version of Sesame Street, noting the short-lived negative reaction of some members of the U.S. Congress to the character.

References

External links
The World According to Sesame Street site for Independent Lens on PBS
 
 

2006 films
2006 documentary films
2000s English-language films
American documentary films
Documentary films about education
Documentary films about television
Films scored by Nathan Wang
Sesame Street
 
Participant (company) films
2000s American films